Frontiers for Young Minds (FYM) is an online non-profit, open access academic journal that publishes STEM articles "edited by kids for kids." UC Berkeley professor of psychology and neuroscience Robert Knight launched the journal at the 2013 Society for Neuroscience Conference, which is published by Frontiers Media.

The journal publishes cutting-edge research and allows budding young scientists, from ages 8 to 15 years old, to participate in the publishing process (not as authors). It has won awards for its review process, easy-to-navigate website, informative visual aids including colorful cartoons, and kid-friendly, accessible writing.

Editorial Structure

Editorial Process 
Established scientists write kid-friendly articles on either core concepts or new discoveries in their fields. To make the scientific research comprehensible for the journal's late elementary and middle school audiences, the articles rely heavily on key words and glossary sections for scientific nomenclature.

After the submission passes a preliminary evaluation by an adult FYP editor, school-aged children, then, decide whether the articles should be published. Alongside a science mentor, a student from the 3rd to 10th grade reviews the articles and provides feedback about the papers' clarity and accessibility.  Then, the original writers, science mentors, and adult FYM editors collaborate to revise the article based on the children's comments.

According to the journal's founders Sabine Kastner and Robert T. Knight, the goal of this process is to expose young children to a wide range of current scientific endeavors, the scientific method and procedures, the review process of scientific articles.

Chief Editors 

 Princeton neuroscience professor Sabine Kastner
 UC Berkeley psychology professor Robert Knight

Science Mentors 
mostly graduate students and postdoctoral fellows

Young Reviewers

Awards 

 ALA’s 2014 Great Websites for Kids
 SfN's 2019 Award for Education in Neuroscience

References

External links 

Frontiers for Young Minds blog on Scientific American website
http://www.ecography.org/blog/exciting-new-partnership-between-frontiers-young-minds-and-ecography

Frontiers Media academic journals
Science education
Open access journals
Science communication
Publications established in 2013
Children's mass media